Simun and variants may refer to:

Places
 Simun, Burma
 Simun, Iran

People
 Šimun, a given name in Croatia and a surname in Croatia and Slovakia
 Símun, head of state of the Faroe Islands
 Símun Mikkjal Zachariasen (1853–1931), Faroese teacher and social activist
 Símun Petur Zachariasen (1887-1977), Faroese teacher, editor, and politician
 Símun av Skarði (1872-1942), Faroese poet, politician and teacher
 Jóan Símun Edmundsson (born 1991), Faroese professional footballer

See also